Destiny is a 1966 bas-relief by Bernard Frazier on the facade of the William J. Holloway Jr. United States Courthouse (200 Northwest 4th Street) in Oklahoma City, in the U.S. state of Oklahoma.

Description and history
The concrete or stone sculpture measures approximately 22 ft. 6 in. x 13 ft. x 16 in., and depicts a woman in the foreground with her arm around an eagle, and a man behind her.

The sculpture was commissioned by the General Services Administration's Art-in-Architecture Program in 1960 for $6,800, and installed in 1967. It was surveyed by the Smithsonian Institution's "Save Outdoor Sculpture!" program in 1994.

References

1966 sculptures
1967 establishments in Oklahoma
Sculptures of birds in the United States
Outdoor sculptures in Oklahoma City
Sculptures of men in Oklahoma
Sculptures of women in Oklahoma